The soft grass mouse  is a species of rodent in the family Cricetidae.
It is found in Ecuador and Peru.

References

Akodon
Mammals described in 1894
Taxa named by Oldfield Thomas
Taxonomy articles created by Polbot